Héctor Salvá González (27 November 1939 – 20 November 2015) was a Uruguayan football midfielder who played for Uruguay in the 1966 FIFA World Cup. He also played for Danubio. In Argentina, he played for Gimnasia de La Plata in 1968-'69, and coached it in 1975.

After he retired from playing, Salva became a football coach. He managed Club Nacional de Football, where he received credit for developing Uruguay international Fabián O'Neill.

References

External links
FIFA profile

1939 births
2015 deaths
Footballers from Montevideo
Uruguayan footballers
Uruguayan expatriate footballers
Uruguay international footballers
1966 FIFA World Cup players
Association football midfielders
Uruguayan Primera División players
Argentine Primera División players
Club Nacional de Football players
Danubio F.C. players
Club de Gimnasia y Esgrima La Plata footballers
Uruguayan football managers
Club Nacional de Football managers
Expatriate footballers in Argentina